Jess Bush (born ) is an Australian actor, model, and visual artist.

Personal life

Visual arts
A visual artist since childhood, Bush began selling her pieces professionally at age 19.  She is also a jewellery designer, and some of her pieces appear on Strange New Worlds.

Bee Totem
Since 2019, Bush has been developing and exhibiting her ongoing Bee Totem series.  She collects dead honey bees from beekeepers, and preserves them in spheres of crystal resin and attaching fine jewellery chains.  Her exhibitions collaborate with projection artists and sound designers to hang the many preserved bees at different heights to create shapes and experiences in three-dimensional space.

For herself, Bee Totem is about recognizing and emphasizing the importance of the bees that, not only make the human world livable, but then "live by the thousands and die quietly by the thousands."  The individual preserved bee in the sphere is amplified and magnified, showing its intelligence and beauty; it causes the observer to "pause and think about the moment that it died, because its frozen in that moment after its death, so its kind of like a memorial."  The installation then amplifies "that impact of thousands dead at the same time".

Having received several rounds of funding from the Australian Government by 2022,  In 2022, Bush described it as "the most significant work that [she's] ever made" with a goal of doing so "probably forever".  She would like to build a cathedral for thousands of preserved bees, to allow people to quietly sit and reflect in the immensity of sacrifice.

Performing arts
Bush competed on the seventh season of the reality TV series Australia's Next Top Model; she told the programme that she entered modeling for the challenge, competitiveness, travel, and variety.  In Australia, she has also performed on Home and Away and Playing for Keeps.

Leaving Australian TV for the first time with 2022's Star Trek: Strange New Worlds, Bush co-stars as Christine Chapel (the second actor in the role after Majel Barrett in the original Star Trek).  Heavy described Bush's interpretation of the character as "very different [...] fun, irreverent, and a bit of a live wire."  Bush eschews her native Australian accent for the performance, a dichotomy that helps her get into character physically and mentally.

Awards

References

External links
 
 
 

1990s births
21st-century Australian actresses
21st-century Australian women artists
actresses from Brisbane
artists from Brisbane
Australian actresses
Australian female models
Australian installation artists
Australian television actresses
jewellery designers
living people
mixed-media artists
Top Model contestants
women installation artists